"Belly Dancer" is a song by Canadian rapper Kardinal Offishall featuring American musician Pharrell Williams, the latter producing it with Chad Hugo as The Neptunes. Released on March 25, 2003, it was originally the first single from the former's unreleased album, Firestarter Vol. 2: The F-Word Theory.

Background
The song was inspired by Naomi Campbell, who was in the studio while the song was recorded. The single briefly appeared on the Billboard charts, and a music video was shot by Little X on May 7, 2003 in Toronto. However, the video remains unreleased, because Kardinal's label at the time, MCA Records, was absorbed into Geffen Records, leaving the single without promotion.

In an interview, Kardinal stated that he does not like the song, and "it was the first thing I did that wasn't from the heart."

Track listing

12" single
A-side
 "Belly Dancer" (Radio Edit) (featuring Pharrell Williams)
 "Belly Dancer" (Instrumental)

B-side
 "Belly Dancer" (Album) (featuring Pharrell Williams)
 "Sick!" (Album) (featuring Bounty Killer)
 "Sick!" (Instrumental)

Chart positions

References

2002 songs
2003 singles
Kardinal Offishall songs
Pharrell Williams songs
MCA Records singles
Song recordings produced by the Neptunes
Songs written by Chad Hugo
Songs written by Pharrell Williams
Songs written by Kardinal Offishall
Dancehall songs